Ulva atroviridis is a species of blackish-green coloured seaweed in the family Ulvaceae that can be found in Port Nolloth of Cape Province in South Africa and in Namibia.

References

Ulvaceae
Plants described in 1938
Flora of Africa